The 2010 Gael Linn Cup, the most important representative competition for elite level participants in the women's team field sport of camogie, was won by Leinster, who defeated Munster in the final, played at Trim.

2010 Senior Competition

References

External links
 Camogie Association

2010 in camogie
2010
Cam